Veenendaal-De Klomp is a railway station located in De Klomp near Veenendaal, Netherlands. The station opened in 1845 and is on the Amsterdam–Arnhem railway. It lies within the borders of the municipality of Ede.

Train services
The following services currently call at Veenendaal-De Klomp:
2x per hour intercity services Schiphol - Amsterdam-Zuid - Bijlmer ArenA - Utrecht - Veenendaal-De Klomp - Ede-Wageningen - Arnhem - Nijmegen

Bus services
Line 80 Amersfoort - Leusden - Woudenberg - Scherpenzeel - Renswoude - Station Veenendaal De Klomp - Station Veenendaal Centrum

Line 50 Utrecht Central Station- Station Driebergen Zeist - Doorn - Amerongen - Elst -Station Veenendaal Centrum  - Station Veenendaal de Klomp

Line 83 Station Veenendaal de Klomp - Station Veenendaal West - Station Veenendaal Centrum

Line 87 Station Veenendaal de Klomp - Veenendaal Oost
Citybus 5 Station Veenendaal de Klomp -Kernhem - Station Ede Centrum - Station Ede Wageningen

Neighborhood bus 505 Overberg - Veenendaal - De Klomp - Ederveen - Lunteren - Wekerom

External links
NS website 
Dutch Public Transport journey planner 

Railway stations in Ede, Netherlands
Railway stations opened in 1845
Railway stations on the Rhijnspoorweg
Veenendaal
Railway stations in the Netherlands opened in 1845